The 2014 Japan Super Series will be the sixth super series tournament of the 2014 BWF Super Series. The tournament took place in Tokyo, Japan from 10–15 June 2014 with a total purse of $250,000.

Men's singles

Seeds 

  Lee Chong Wei
  Chen Long
  Jan Ø. Jørgensen
  Kenichi Tago
  Tommy Sugiarto
  Shon Wan-ho
  Nguyen Tien Minh
  Hu Yun

Top half

Bottom half

Finals

Women's singles

Seeds 

  Li Xuerui
  Wang Yihan
  Ratchanok Intanon
  Sung Ji-hyun
  Bae Yeon-ju
  Tai Tzu-ying
  Porntip Buranaprasertsuk
  Carolina Marín

Top half

Bottom half

Finals

Men's doubles

Seeds 

  Muhammad Ahsan / Hendra Setiawan
  Mathias Boe / Carsten Mogensen
  Hiroyuki Endo / Kenichi Hayakawa
  Kim Ki-jung / Kim Sa-rang
  Lee Yong-dae / Yoo Yeon-seong
  Lee Sheng-mu / Tsai Chia-hsin
  Hoon Thien How / Tan Wee Kiong
  Chris Adcock / Andrew Ellis

Top half

Bottom half

Finals

Women's doubles

Seeds 

  Bao Yixin / Tang Jinhua
  Christinna Pedersen / Kamilla Rytter Juhl
  Misaki Matsutomo / Ayaka Takahashi
  Reika Kakiiwa / Miyuki Maeda
  Jang Ye-na / Kim So-young
  Jung Kyung-eun / Kim Ha-na
  Duanganong Aroonkesorn / Kunchala Voravichitchaikul
  Ko A-ra / Yoo Hae-won

Top half

Bottom half

Finals

Mixed doubles

Seeds 

  Zhang Nan / Zhao Yunlei
  Chris Adcock / Gabrielle Adcock
  Ko Sung-hyun / Kim Ha-na
  Sudket Prapakamol / Saralee Thoungthongkam
  Lee Chun Hei / Chau Hoi Wah
  Shin Baek-cheol / Jang Ye-na
  Riky Widianto / Puspita Richi Dili
  Michael Fuchs / Birgit Michels

Top half

Bottom half

Finals

References 

Japan
Japan Open (badminton)
2014 in Japanese sport
Sports competitions in Tokyo
Japan Super Series